Welander is a surname of Swedish origin. Notable people with the surname include:

Clinton Welander (born 1982), American audio engineer
Lisa Welander (1909–2001), Swedish neurologist
Majvor Welander (1950–2016), Swedish swimmer
Marta Welander, British human rights activist
Svea Nordblad Welander (1898-1985), Swedish composer

References

Surnames of Swedish origin